Barra da Tijuca (usually known as Barra) is an upper-class neighborhood or bairro in the West Zone of Rio de Janeiro, Brazil, located in the western portion of the city on the Atlantic Ocean. Barra is well known for its beaches, its many lakes and rivers, and its lifestyle. This neighbourhood represents 4.7% of the city population and 13% of the total area of Rio de Janeiro.

Barra da Tijuca is classified as one of the most developed places in Brazil, with one of the highest Human Development Indexes (HDI) in the country, as measured in the 2000 Brazil Census. Unlike the South Zone and Rio's Downtown, Barra da Tijuca, built only 30 years ago, follows the Modernist standards, with large boulevards creating the major transit axis. The area's masterplan was designed by Lúcio Costa, known for his work on Brasília, and creates a region filled with many gardens, shopping malls, apartment buildings and large mansions. In recent years, due to the rapid development of the Brazilian economy, Barra's population has increased by over 100,000, as a large number of residents and companies search for cheaper real estate as an alternative to the densely populated South Zone of Rio. Demographic data indicates that the region is the fastest growing neighborhood in Rio: 98,851 in 1991, 174,353 in 2000, and 300,823 in 2010.

Barra natives and residents are known as Barristas, or more popularly, Barrenses. The neighborhood is a cultural, economic, and administrative hub of the city, and is believed to be the safest of Rio's upper-class neighbourhoods because of its lack of favelas and plentiful private and public security. It is the home of several celebrities and football players. In August 2016, Barra hosted most of the venues of the 2016 Summer Olympics, the first held in South America.

Etymology
The name Barra da Tijuca can be roughly translated as "clay sandbank". Barra means port entrance or sandbank, and Tijuca is a word originally from the Tupi ty-yúc and means putrid water, mud, swamp, puddle, clay or clay-pit. 
Tijuca (meaning marsh or swamp)  from ty ("water") and îuká ("to kill").

History

The region of Barra da Tijuca was originally a large beach, with typical undergrowth sandbanks. The area,  full of swamps and unsuitable for planting, remained unoccupied until the middle of the twentieth century, even though occasional groups of fishermen frequented the region. In 1667, the region was given to religious Benedictines, who settled only in the neighborhoods of Camorim, Vargem Pequena, and Vargem Grande. In 1900, the lands of Barra da Tijuca and Baixada Jacarepaguá were sold to the company Remedial Territorial Agricultural and SA, ESTA, which remains a large land owner in the area. The concentration of large tracts of land in the hands of a few was one of the causes of its late growth. Additionally it is separated from the rest of the municipality by large, difficult-to-cross mountain ranges with peaks ranging from 800–1200 meters.

Development of the area took place initially on its two ends, in current Jardim Oceânico and in Recreio dos Bandeirantes. A bridge was then built by private initiative over the Tijuca Lagoon to serve the area's new inhabitants. Significant early development of Barra da Tijuca occurred during the administration of Governor Negrão de Lima, the former governor of the state of Guanabara, who commissioned Lúcio Costa, one of the region's urban designers. The plan for Barra in 1969 was similar to the earlier one for Brasília. It was inspired by American urban planning style with wide boulevards and large open spaces.

In the 1970s the Lagoa–Barra Highway was built, which allowed a greater development since it reduced the time to go to the South Zone of the city of Rio. At the same time, large planned condominiums were developed in Barra, such as the condominiums Nova Ipanema and Novo Leblon. In the 1990s, another large urban development that enabled better connection with the North Zone of Rio was the creation of the Yellow Line, an expressway linking Barra da Tijuca to the Galeão International Airport. Since then, the growth of Barra da Tijuca has been characterized by large inflows of people from all parts of the metropolitan region of Rio de Janeiro.

Barra City's Project 
During the 1980s, Barra da Tijuca experienced a population explosion, with virtually all the land along its boulevards occupied by large residential condominiums, parks, supermarkets, shopping malls, schools and hospitals. The avenues were widened and received traffic lights. At this time there was a movement for the declaration of Barra as a separate city; While there was a referendum to this effect, and a majority of voters voted to make it a separate city, turnout was too low for it to succeed. 

There is still a bill in progress in the Legislative Assembly of Rio de Janeiro for the formation of a new Barra da Tijuca council from the region's districts (Barra, Recreio, Grumari, Vargem Pequena, Vargem Grande, Itanhangá, Joá e Camorim). The project, however, depends on the approval of the Federal Congressional bill PEC 13/03, which transfers to the states the power to legislate on this matter, as it was until 1996.

Lifestyle

As the most recent region, built only about thirty years ago, Barra introduced a way of living characterized by large luxury condominiums with leisure infrastructure (sports courts, pools, private groves and lakes, spas, gyms) inside of the condominium for the use of its residents and guests. The "neighborhood-condos", as they were named, have the idea of creating an exclusive neighborhood for its residents, making it possible for them to live a complete life without the need to leave the condominium. The condos also have a high security system to ensure the privacy and safety of its residents. The residential areas of Barra are also known as being environmentally friendly.

The region is characterized by a car culture, and is crossed by three main routes: the Avenue of the America - "Avenida das Américas" (the main road in the region, approximately 21 km long), "Avenida Ayrton Senna" (which connects the district of Barra and the Yellow Line, or 'Linha Amarela' highway) and "Avenida Lúcio Costa", formerly Sernambetiba Avenue, which follows the coastline.Here we are in the south east of asia

Areas

Jardim Oceânico
Jardim Oceânico (Portuguese: Ocean Garden) is a subdistrict of Barra da Tijuca. Predominantly formed by three-story buildings It is an area similar to the South Zone of Rio de Janeiro. As part of the preparations for the Rio 2016 Olympics, a subway station was opened in the neighborhood. The mainly residential area is also home to several bars and restaurants on the Olegario Maciel and Erico Verissimo streets.

Península

Península was designed by a real estate company, the original project being the creation of a new environmentally friendly neighborhood called Península Barra. However, the project evolved from being a neighborhood to a massive private urban development complex, making the Península (which has the same size of Leblon's neighborhood) the newest and first eco-friendly urban development complex in Rio de Janeiro. Located in the heart of Barra, right behind the Barra Shopping in an area surrounded by its own private lake (Península Bay) and extensive leisure infrastructure, Península won the prize of the best urban development complex in Brazil. The complex, which still has some towers under construction, will consist at its completion of 62 residential towers, two business towers, a mini mall, five theme gardens and two large parks. The real estate boom in Rio after the city was chosen for the 2016 Summer Olympics affected the prices in Península; researches show that the prices have increased up to 300%, making the square meter in Península one of the most expensive in the city of Rio de Janeiro. The complex, considered one of the best family urban developments in the city, is now one of the favorite places of the celebrities of Rede Globo.

Education
Several universities have a campus in the district, including Universidade Estácio de Sá, Pontifícia Universidade Católica, Universidade Gama Filho, Universidade Veiga de Almeida, Centro Universitário IBMR-Laureate and Instituto Brasileiro de Mercado de Capitais. Schools in the district include the Escola Suíço-Brasileira Rio de Janeiro.

Shopping malls

The neighborhood of Barra is home to many large modern malls, including Barra Shopping on Avenue of the Americas.

Transportation
There are three main avenues in Barra: Avenida das Américas (which connects almost the whole area of Barra), Avenida Ayrton Senna (formerly Avenida Alvorada, which connects Barra to Jacarepaguá neighbourhood) and Avenida Lúcio costa (formerly Avenida Sernambetiba, which passes alongside the beach). The connection works of Barra with the rest of the urban network are among the most expensive works already carried out in Rio. Barra has many bus routes and in 2009, Barra's subway line started to be built for the 2016 Rio Summer Olympics. Jacarepaguá Airport, an airport specialized in general aviation, is also located in the neighborhood.

Sports

The Brazilian Jiu-Jitsu academy Gracie Barra originated in Barra and is named after it.
The 2007 Pan American Games and 2016 Summer Olympics and Paralympics took place for the most part in Barra, the latter featuring 12 permanent and three temporary venues.
The football (soccer) club Barra da Tijuca Futebol Clube derives its name from the region. Its headquarters are located in neighbouring Camorim.
Three major Associations' headquarters are located in Barra da Tijuca: the Brazilian Football Confederation, the Brazilian Volleyball Confederation and Brazilian Olympic Committee.
The Golden Green Golf Club provides three-par six-hole court greens open to outside players with illumination for night play. Itanhanga Golf Club is also nearby.
Surf competitions, such as Rio Marathon Surf Internacional, Festival Petrobras de Surfe, Campeonato Velox Surf Amador and Circuito Petrobras are held in Barra. There are several surfing schools in the neighbourhood, an evidence of the popularity of this sport with the locals.
The Aero Clube do Brasil provides parachuting experiences. The Rio Sport Center offers tennis courts to the public. Barrashopping and Barra Square are home to bowling alleys.
There are several places where beach and court volleyball are practised. The Bernandinho's School is located in Barra.
The numerous condos also offer several others sports courts exclusively for their residents.

Beach

The 18 km long beach is the largest of Rio de Janeiro's beaches. Barra's beach starts at Morro do Joá and ends at the Recreio dos Bandeirantes neighborhood, in Pontal de Sernambetiba, beyond Avenida Lúcio Costa. Most of its waters are clear and green, and have an uncommon wave formation. Barra da Tijuca beach is one of the most sought after beaches by surfers, windsurfers, bodyboarders, kitesurfers and fishing enthusiasts. There is also a cycling lane along the beach. Pepê beach, closer do Morro do Joá, has kite surf schools, food kiosks, and surf schools.

Culture

Teatro dos Grandes Atores
The Teatro dos Grandes Atores (Great Actors Theater) is located in the Shopping Barra Square mall. It has a small 35 square metres (380 sq ft) foyer, and two auditoriums, each with 396 seats, the Blue Room and the Red Room. Both have good acoustics, and balconies that give good views of the stage. The theater opened in 1995 with Aparecida Margarida, with Marília Pêra, in the Blue Room and A Era do Rádio directed by Sérgio Britto in the Red Room.
Ricardo Torres was staged here in 1996.
Since 2009 the theater has partnered with Agência do Bem, and since 2011 has let the agency's Orquestra Nova Sinfonia, a youth orchestra, use its stage for rehearsals.

Criticism
The influence from different countries is criticized by many citizens from the older areas of Rio de Janeiro, especially concerning the 26.8 meters (88 feet) high replica of the Statue of Liberty in the New York City Center. Barra also has replicas of many international architectural icons like the Leaning Tower of Pisa, the Tower Bridge of London, and the Eiffel Tower of Paris (all found in the Barra World Shopping Center).

See also

List of upscale shopping districts

References

Much of the content of this article comes from the equivalent Portuguese-language Wikipedia article (retrieved August 19, 2005).

External links
Barra da Tijuca 360° panorama
Barra da Tijuca Guide
Barra da Tijuca: O Concebido e o Realizado
Barra Online
A Barra da Tijuca que conheci at Pitoresco

Neighbourhoods in Rio de Janeiro (city)
Venues of the 2016 Summer Olympics
Beaches of Rio de Janeiro (city)